José Adolis García Arrieta (born March 2, 1993, nicknamed "El Bombi" is a Cuban professional baseball outfielder for the Texas Rangers of Major League Baseball (MLB). He previously played in MLB for the St. Louis Cardinals and in Nippon Professional Baseball (NPB) for the Yomiuri Giants.

Career
García played for Ciego de Ávila of the Cuban National Series.

Yomiuri Giants
On April 20, 2016, he signed with the Yomiuri Giants of Nippon Professional Baseball. García played for the Cuban national team at the 2015 Pan American Games.

St. Louis Cardinals
García defected from Cuba in 2016. He signed with the St. Louis Cardinals in February 2017, receiving a non-roster invitation to spring training. He spent 2017 with both the Springfield Cardinals of the Class AA Texas League and the Memphis Redbirds of the Class AAA Pacific Coast League, posting a combined .290 batting average with 15 home runs and 65 runs batted in between both clubs.

García began the 2018 season with Memphis. The Cardinals promoted him to the major leagues on August 6. In 112 games for Memphis, he batted .256 with 22 home runs, 71 RBI, and ten stolen bases, and in 21 games for St. Louis, he hit .118.

García was designated for assignment on December 18, 2019.

Texas Rangers
On December 21, 2019, García was traded to the Texas Rangers in exchange for cash considerations. In 2020 for the Rangers, García recorded only six at-bats, and went hitless on the year. On February 10, 2021, García was designated for assignment after the signing of Mike Foltynewicz was made official. On February 12, García was outrighted and invited to Spring Training as a non-roster invitee. On April 13, 2021, García was selected to the active roster after Ronald Guzmán was placed on the injured list. García was named the American League Rookie of the Month for May 2021 after hitting .312 with a .633 slugging percentage and 11 home runs. García was named as a reserve for the American League in the 2021 MLB All-Star Game, and went one-for-two with a double in the game. In 2021, García batted .243/.286/.454/.741 and led all rookies with 90 RBI and 59 extra-base hits. He also hit 31 home runs and tied for the league lead with 16 outfield assists.

Over 156 games for Texas in 2022, García hit .250/.300/.456/.756 with 27 home runs, 101 RBI, and 25 stolen bases.

Personal life
His older brother, Adonis García is a retired professional baseball player.

See also
List of baseball players who defected from Cuba

References

External links
, or NPB

1993 births
Living people
American League All-Stars
Baseball players at the 2015 Pan American Games
Defecting Cuban baseball players
Cuban expatriate baseball players in Japan
Major League Baseball outfielders
Major League Baseball players from Cuba
Cuban expatriate baseball players in the United States
Memphis Redbirds players
Nippon Professional Baseball left fielders
Pan American Games medalists in baseball
Pan American Games bronze medalists for Cuba
People from Ciego de Ávila
Springfield Cardinals players
St. Louis Cardinals players
Texas Rangers players
Tigres de Ciego de Avila players
Yomiuri Giants players
Medalists at the 2015 Pan American Games
Gigantes del Cibao players
Cuban expatriate baseball players in the Dominican Republic